Edward Estlin Cummings, who was also known as E. E. Cummings, e. e. cummings and e e cummings (October 14, 1894 - September 3, 1962), was an American poet, painter, essayist, author and playwright. He wrote approximately 2,900 poems, two autobiographical novels, four plays, and several essays. He is often regarded as one of the most important American poets of the 20th century. Cummings is associated with modernist free-form poetry. Much of his work has idiosyncratic syntax and uses lower-case spellings for poetic expression.

Life

Early years
Edward Estlin Cummings was born on October 14, 1894, in Cambridge, Massachusetts, to Edward Cummings and the former Rebecca Haswell Clarke, a well-known Unitarian couple in the city. His father was a professor at Harvard University who later became nationally known as the minister of South Congregational Church (Unitarian) in Boston, Massachusetts. His mother, who loved to spend time with her children, played games with Cummings and his sister, Elizabeth. From an early age, Cummings' parents supported his creative gifts. Cummings wrote poems and drew as a child, and he often played outdoors with the many other children who lived in his neighborhood. He grew up in the company of such family friends as the philosophers William James and Josiah Royce. Many of Cummings' summers were spent on Silver Lake in Madison, New Hampshire, where his father had built two houses along the eastern shore. The family ultimately purchased the nearby Joy Farm where Cummings had his primary summer residence.

He expressed transcendental leanings his entire life. As he matured, Cummings moved to an "I, Thou" relationship with God. His journals are replete with references to "le bon Dieu", as well as prayers for inspiration in his poetry and artwork (such as "Bon Dieu! may i some day do something truly great. amen."). Cummings "also prayed for strength to be his essential self ('may I be I is the only prayer—not may I be great or good or beautiful or wise or strong'), and for relief of spirit in times of depression ('almighty God! I thank thee for my soul; & may I never die spiritually into a mere mind through disease of loneliness')".

Cummings wanted to be a poet from childhood and wrote poetry daily from age 8 to 22, exploring assorted forms. He graduated from Harvard University with a Bachelor of Arts degree magna cum laude and Phi Beta Kappa in 1915 and received a Master of Arts degree from the university in 1916. In his studies at Harvard, he developed an interest in modern poetry, which ignored conventional grammar and syntax, while aiming for a dynamic use of language. Upon graduating, he worked for a book dealer.

War years
In 1917, with the First World War ongoing in Europe, Cummings enlisted in the Norton-Harjes Ambulance Corps. On the boat to France, he met William Slater Brown and they would become friends. Due to an administrative error, Cummings and Brown did not receive an assignment for five weeks, a period they spent exploring Paris. Cummings fell in love with the city, to which he would return throughout his life.

During their service in the ambulance corps, the two young writers sent letters home that drew the attention of the military censors. They were known to prefer the company of French soldiers over fellow ambulance drivers. The two openly expressed anti-war views; Cummings spoke of his lack of hatred for the Germans. On September 21, 1917, five months after starting his belated assignment, Cummings and William Slater Brown were arrested by the French military on suspicion of espionage and undesirable activities. They were held for three and a half months in a military detention camp at the Dépôt de Triage, in La Ferté-Macé, Orne, Normandy.

They were imprisoned with other detainees in a large room. Cummings' father failed to obtain his son's release through diplomatic channels, and in December 1917 he wrote a letter to President Woodrow Wilson. Cummings was released on December 19, 1917, and Brown was released two months later. Cummings used his prison experience as the basis for his novel, The Enormous Room (1922), about which F. Scott Fitzgerald said, "Of all the work by young men who have sprung up since 1920 one book survives—The Enormous Room by e.e. cummings ... Those few who cause books to live have not been able to endure the thought of its mortality."

Cummings returned to the United States on New Year's Day 1918. Later in 1918 he was drafted into the army. He served a training deployment in the 12th Division at Camp Devens, Massachusetts, until November 1918.

Post-war years
Cummings returned to Paris in 1921 and lived there for two years before returning to New York. His collection Tulips and Chimneys was published in 1923 and his inventive use of grammar and syntax is evident. The book was heavily cut by his editor. XLI Poems was published in 1925. With these collections, Cummings made his reputation as an avant garde poet.

During the rest of the 1920s and 1930s, Cummings returned to Paris a number of times, and traveled throughout Europe, meeting, among others, artist Pablo Picasso. In 1931 Cummings traveled to the Soviet Union, recounting his experiences in Eimi, published two years later. During these years Cummings also traveled to Northern Africa and Mexico. He worked as an essayist and portrait artist for Vanity Fair magazine (1924–1927).

In 1926, Cummings' parents were in a car crash; only his mother survived, although she was severely injured. Cummings later described the crash in the following passage from his i: six nonlectures series given at Harvard (as part of the Charles Eliot Norton Lectures) in 1952 and 1953:

His father's death had a profound effect on Cummings, who entered a new period in his artistic life. He began to focus on more important aspects of life in his poetry. He started this new period by paying homage to his father in the poem "my father moved through dooms of love".

In the 1930s Samuel Aiwaz Jacobs was Cummings' publisher; he had started the Golden Eagle Press after working as a typographer and publisher.

Final years

In 1952, his alma mater, Harvard University, awarded Cummings an honorary seat as a guest professor. The Charles Eliot Norton Lectures he gave in 1952 and 1955 were later collected as i: six nonlectures.

Cummings spent the last decade of his life traveling, fulfilling speaking engagements, and spending time at his summer home, Joy Farm, in Silver Lake, New Hampshire. He died of a stroke on September 3, 1962, at the age of 67 at Memorial Hospital in North Conway, New Hampshire. Cummings was buried at Forest Hills Cemetery in Boston, Massachusetts. At the time of his death, Cummings was recognized as the "second most widely read poet in the United States, after Robert Frost".

Cummings' papers are held at the Houghton Library at Harvard University and the Harry Ransom Center at the University of Texas at Austin.

Personal life

Marriages

Cummings was married briefly twice, first to Elaine Thayer, then to Anne Minnerly Barton. His longest relationship lasted more than three decades with Marion Morehouse.

In 2020, it was revealed that in 1917, before his first marriage, Cummings had shared several passionate love letters with a Parisian prostitute, Marie Louise Lallemand. Despite Cummings' efforts, he was unable to find Lallemand upon his return to Paris after the front.

Cummings' first marriage, to Elaine Orr, his cousin, began as a love affair in 1918 while she was still married to Scofield Thayer, one of Cummings' friends from Harvard. During this time he wrote a good deal of his erotic poetry. After divorcing Thayer, Orr married Cummings on March 19, 1924. The couple had a daughter together out of wedlock. However, the couple separated after two months of marriage and divorced less than nine months later.

Cummings married his second wife Anne Minnerly Barton on May 1, 1929. They separated three years later in 1932. That same year, Minnerly obtained a Mexican divorce; it was not officially recognized in the United States until August 1934. Anne died in 1970 aged 72.

In 1934, after his separation from his second wife, Cummings met Marion Morehouse, a fashion model and photographer. Although it is not clear whether the two were ever formally married, Morehouse lived with Cummings until his death in 1962. She died on May 18, 1969, while living at 4 Patchin Place, Greenwich Village, New York City, where Cummings had resided since September 1924.

Political views
According to his testimony in EIMI, Cummings had little interest in politics until his trip to the Soviet Union in 1931. He subsequently shifted rightward on many political and social issues. Despite his radical and bohemian public image, he was a Republican and later an ardent supporter of Joseph McCarthy.

Work

Poetry
Despite Cummings' familiarity with avant-garde styles (likely affected by the Calligrammes of French poet Apollinaire, according to a contemporary observation), much of his work is quite traditional. Many of his poems are sonnets, albeit often with a modern twist. He occasionally used the blues form and acrostics. Cummings' poetry often deals with themes of love and nature, as well as the relationship of the individual to the masses and to the world. His poems are also often rife with satire.

While his poetic forms and themes share an affinity with the Romantic tradition, Cummings' work universally shows a particular idiosyncrasy of syntax, or way of arranging individual words into larger phrases and sentences. Many of his most striking poems do not involve any typographical or punctuation innovations at all, but purely syntactic ones.

As well as being influenced by notable modernists, including Gertrude Stein and Ezra Pound, Cummings in his early work drew upon the imagist experiments of Amy Lowell. Later, his visits to Paris exposed him to Dada and Surrealism, which he reflected in his work. He began to rely on symbolism and allegory, where he once had used simile and metaphor. In his later work, he rarely used comparisons that required objects that were not previously mentioned in the poem, choosing to use a symbol instead. Due to this, his later poetry is "frequently more lucid, more moving, and more profound than his earlier". Cummings also liked to incorporate imagery of nature and death into much of his poetry.

While some of his poetry is free verse (with no concern for rhyme or meter), many have a recognizable sonnet structure of 14 lines, with an intricate rhyme scheme. A number of his poems feature a typographically exuberant style, with words, parts of words, or punctuation symbols scattered across the page, often making little sense until read aloud, at which point the meaning and emotion become clear. Cummings, who was also a painter, understood the importance of presentation, and used typography to "paint a picture" with some of his poems.

The seeds of Cummings' unconventional style appear well established even in his earliest work. At age six, he wrote to his father:

Following his autobiographical novel, The Enormous Room, Cummings' first published work was a collection of poems titled Tulips and Chimneys (1923). This work was the public's first encounter with his characteristically eccentric use of grammar and punctuation.

Some of Cummings' most famous poems do not involve much, if any, idiosyncratic typography or punctuation, but they still carry his unmistakable style, particularly in unusual and impressionistic word order.

Cummings' works often do not follow the conventional rules that generate typical English sentences (for example, "they sowed their isn't"). In addition, a number of Cummings' poems feature, in part or in whole, intentional misspellings, and several incorporate phonetic spellings intended to represent particular dialects. Cummings also made use of inventive formations of compound words, as in his poem "in Just", which features words such as "mud-luscious", "puddle-wonderful", and "eddieandbill". This poem is part of a sequence of poems titled Chansons Innocentes; it has many references comparing the "balloonman" to Pan, the mythical creature that is half-goat and half-man. Literary critic R.P. Blackmur has commented that this use of language is "frequently unintelligible because [Cummings] disregards the historical accumulation of meaning in words in favour of merely private and personal associations".

Fellow poet Edna St. Vincent Millay, in her equivocal letter recommending Cummings for the Guggenheim Fellowship he was awarded in 1934, expressed her frustration at his opaque symbolism. "[I]f he prints and offers for sale poetry which he is quite content should be, after hours of sweating concentration, inexplicable from any point of view to a person as intelligent as myself, then he does so with a motive which is frivolous from the point of view of art, and should not be helped or encouraged by any serious person or group of persons... there is fine writing and powerful writing (as well as some of the most pompous nonsense I ever let slip to the floor with a wide yawn)... What I propose, then, is this: that you give Mr. Cummings enough rope. He may hang himself; or he may lasso a unicorn."

Many of Cummings' poems are satirical and address social issues but have an equal or even stronger bias toward romanticism: time and again his poems celebrate love, sex, and the season of rebirth.

Cummings also wrote children's books and novels. A notable example of his versatility is an introduction he wrote for a collection of the comic strip Krazy Kat.

Controversy
Cummings is known for controversial subject matter, as he wrote numerous erotic poems. He also sometimes included ethnic slurs in his writing. For instance, in his 1950 collection Xaipe: Seventy-One Poems, Cummings published two poems containing words that caused outrage in some quarters.

one day a nigger
caught in his hand
a little star no bigger
than not to understand

i'll never let you go
until you've made me white"
so she did and now
stars shine at night.

and

a kike is the most dangerous
machine as yet invented
by even yankee ingenu
ity(out of a jew a few
dead dollars and some twisted laws)
it comes both prigged and canted

Cummings biographer Catherine Reef notes of the controversy:

William Carlos Williams spoke out in his defense.

Plays
During his lifetime, Cummings published four plays. HIM, a three-act play, was first produced in 1928 by the Provincetown Players in New York City. The production was directed by James Light. The play's main characters are "Him", a playwright, portrayed by William Johnstone, and "Me", his girlfriend, portrayed by Erin O'Brien-Moore.

Cummings said of the unorthodox play:

Anthropos, or the Future of Art is a short, one-act play that Cummings contributed to the anthology Whither, Whither or After Sex, What? A Symposium to End Symposium. The play consists of dialogue between Man, the main character, and three "infrahumans", or inferior beings. The word anthropos is the Greek word for "man", in the sense of "mankind".

Tom, A Ballet is a ballet based on Uncle Tom's Cabin. The ballet is detailed in a "synopsis" as well as descriptions of four "episodes", which were published by Cummings in 1935. It has never been performed.

Santa Claus: A Morality was probably Cummings' most successful play. It is an allegorical Christmas fantasy presented in one act of five scenes. The play was inspired by his daughter Nancy, with whom he was reunited in 1946. It was first published in the Harvard College magazine, Wake. The play's main characters are Santa Claus, his family (Woman and Child), Death, and Mob. At the outset of the play, Santa Claus's family has disintegrated due to their lust for knowledge (Science). After a series of events, however, Santa Claus's faith in love and his rejection of the materialism and disappointment he associates with Science are reaffirmed, and he is reunited with Woman and Child.

Art
Cummings was an avid visual artist, referring to writing and painting as his twin obsessions and to himself as a poetandpainter. He painted continuously, relentlessly, from childhood until his death, and left in his estate more than 1600 oils and watercolors (a figure that does not include the works he sold during his career) and over 9,000 drawings. In a self-interview from Foreword to an Exhibit: II (1945), the artist asked himself, Tell me, doesn’t your painting interfere with your writing? and answered, Quite the contrary: they love each other dearly.

Cummings had more than 30 exhibits of his paintings in his lifetime. He received substantial acclaim as an American cubist and an abstract, avant garde painter between the World Wars, but with the publication of his books The Enormous Room and Tulips and Chimneys in the 1920s, his reputation as a poet eclipsed his success as a visual artist. In 1931, he published a limited edition volume of his artwork entitled CIOPW, named for his media of charcoal, ink, oil, pencil, and watercolor. About this same time, he began to break from Modernist aesthetics and employ a more subjective and spontaneous style; his work became more representational: landscapes, nudes, still lifes, and portraits.

Name and capitalization
Cummings' publishers and others have often echoed the unconventional orthography in his poetry by writing his name in lower case. Cummings himself used both the lowercase and capitalized versions, though he most often signed his name with capitals.

The use of lower case for his initials was popularized in part by the title of some books, particularly in the 1960s, printing his name in lower case on the cover and spine. In the preface to E. E. Cummings: The Growth of a Writer by Norman Friedman, critic Harry T. Moore notes Cummings "had his name put legally into lower case, and in his later books the titles and his name were always in lower case". According to Cummings' widow, however, this is incorrect. She wrote to Friedman: "You should not have allowed H. Moore to make such a stupid & childish statement about Cummings & his signature." On February 27, 1951, Cummings wrote to his French translator D. Jon Grossman that he preferred the use of upper case for the particular edition they were working on. One Cummings scholar believes that on the rare occasions that Cummings signed his name in all lower case, he may have intended it as a gesture of humility, not as an indication that it was the preferred orthography for others to use. Additionally, The Chicago Manual of Style, which prescribes favoring non-standard capitalization of names in accordance with the bearer's strongly stated preference, notes "E. E. Cummings can be safely capitalized; it was one of his publishers, not he himself, who lowercased his name."

Adaptations
In 1943, modern dancer and choreographer Jean Erdman presented "The Transformations of Medusa, Forever and Sunsmell" with a commissioned score by John Cage and a spoken text from the title poem by E. E. Cummings, sponsored by the Arts Club of Chicago. Erdman also choreographed "Twenty Poems" (1960), a cycle of E. E. Cummings' poems for eight dancers and one actor, with a commissioned score by Teiji Ito. It was performed in the round at the Circle in the Square Theatre in Greenwich Village.

Numerous composers have set Cummings' poems to music:
 In 1961, Pierre Boulez composed cummings ist der dichter from poems by E. E. Cummings.
 Aribert Reimann set Cummings to music in "Impression IV" (1961) for soprano and piano.
 Morton Feldman (1926–1987) in 1951 composed "4 Songs to e.e. cummings" for soprano, piano and cello, using material from Cummings' "50 poems" of 1940: "!Blac", "Air", "(Sitting In A Tree-)" and "(Moan)".
 The Icelandic singer Björk used lines from Cummings' poem "I Will Wade Out" for the lyrics of "Sun in My Mouth" on her 2001 album Vespertine. On her next album, Medúlla (2004), Björk used his poem "It May Not Always Be So" as the lyrics for the song "Sonnets/Unrealities XI".
 The American composer Eric Whitacre wrote a cycle of works for choir titled The City and the Sea, which consists of five poems by Cummings set to music. He also wrote music for “little tree” and “i carry your heart,” among others.
 Others who have composed settings for his poems include Dominic Argento, William Bergsma, Leonard Bernstein, Marc Blitzstein, John Cage, Romeo Cascarino, Aaron Copland, Serge de Gastyne, David Diamond, John Duke, Margaret Garwood, Daron Hagen, Michael Hedges, Timothy Hoekman, Richard Hundley, Barbara Kolb, Leonard Lehrman, Robert Manno, Salvatore Martirano, William Mayer, John Musto, Paul Nordoff, Tobias Picker, Vincent Persichetti, Ned Rorem, Peter Schickele, Elie Siegmeister, Ann Loomis Silsbee, Aki Takase, Hugo Weisgall, Dan Welcher, and James Yannatos, among many others.

Awards
During his lifetime, Cummings received numerous awards in recognition of his work, including:
 Dial Award (1925)
 Guggenheim Fellowship (1933)
 Shelley Memorial Award for Poetry (1945)
 Harriet Monroe Prize from Poetry magazine (1950)
 Fellowship of American Academy of Poets (1950)
 Guggenheim Fellowship (1951)
 Charles Eliot Norton Professorship at Harvard (1952–1953)
 Special citation from the National Book Award Committee for his Poems, 1923–1954 (1957)
 Bollingen Prize in Poetry (1958)
 Boston Arts Festival Award (1957)
 Two-year Ford Foundation grant of $15,000 (1959)

Books

 CIOPW (1931), art works
i—six nonlectures (1953), Harvard University Press

Prose books
 The Enormous Room (1922)
 EIMI (1933), Soviet travelogue
 Fairy Tales (1965), collection of short stories

Poetry
 Tulips and Chimneys (1923)
 & (1925), self-published
 XLI Poems (1925)
 is 5 (1926)
 ViVa (1931)
 No Thanks (1935)
 Collected Poems (1938)
 50 Poems (1940)
 1 × 1 (1944)
 XAIPE: Seventy-One Poems (1950)
 Poems, 1923–1954 (1954)
 95 Poems (1958)
 Selected Poems 1923-1958 (1960)
 73 Poems (1963, posthumous)
 Etcetera: The Unpublished Poems (1983)
 Complete Poems, 1904–1962, edited by George James Firmage (2008), Liveright
 Erotic Poems, edited by George James Firmage (2010), Norton

Plays
 HIM (1927)
 Santa Claus: A Morality (1946)

References

Citations

General and cited references 
 
 Friedman, Norman (editor), E. E. Cummings: A Collection of Critical Essays. 
 Friedman, Norman, E. E. Cummings: The Art of His Poetry.

Further reading
 
 Galgano, Andrea, La furiosa ricerca di Edward E. Cummings, in Mosaico, Roma, Aracne, 2013, pp. 441–444 
 Heusser, Martin. I Am My Writing: The Poetry of E.E. Cummings. Tübingen: Stauffenburg, 1997.
 Hutchinson, Hazel. The War That Used Up Words: American Writers and the First World War. New Haven, CT: Yale University Press, 2015.
 James, George, E. E. Cummings: A Bibliography.
 McBride, Katharine, A Concordance to the Complete Poems of E.E.Cummings.
 Mott, Christopher. "The Cummings Line on Race", Spring: The Journal of the E. E. Cummings Society, vol. 4, pp. 71–75, Fall 1995.
 Norman, Charles, E. E. Cummings: The Magic-Maker, Boston, Little Brown, 1972.

External links

 
 
 
 
 E. E. Cummings, Lifelong Unitarian Biography of Cummings and his relationship with Unitarianism
 E.E. Cummings Personal Library at LibraryThing
 Papers of E. E. Cummings at the Houghton Library at Harvard University
 E. E. Cummings Collection  at the Harry Ransom Center at the University of Texas at Austin
 Poems by E. E. Cummings at PoetryFoundation.org
 Jonathan Yardley, E. E. Cummings: A Biography, Sunday, October 17, 2004, Page BW02, The Washington Post Book Review
 SPRING:The Journal of the E. E. Cummings Society
 Modern American Poetry
 E. E. Cummings at Library of Congress Authorities – with 202 catalog records
 Biography and poems of E. E. Cummings at Poets.org
 Finding aid to Edward Estlin Cummings correspondence at Columbia University. Rare Book & Manuscript Library.

 
1894 births
1962 deaths
20th-century American male writers
20th-century American poets
American Field Service personnel of World War I
American male poets
American modernist poets
American Unitarians
Analysands of Fritz Wittels
Bollingen Prize recipients
Burials at Forest Hills Cemetery (Boston)
Formalist poets
Harvard Advocate alumni
Lost Generation writers
Massachusetts Republicans
Military personnel from Massachusetts
Modernist writers
Old Right (United States)
People from Carroll County, New Hampshire
People from Greenwich Village
Poets from Massachusetts
Sonneteers
Writers from Cambridge, Massachusetts
Members of the American Academy of Arts and Letters